Adolfas Valeška (15 March 1905, in Kybartai – 11 May 1994, in Kaunas, Lithuania) was a Lithuanian stained glass artist, painter, stage designer, and museum director who worked in Lithuania and in Chicago, Illinois.

Valeška graduated from the Kaunas Art School in 1928. He then began work as a church decorator, moving on to co-found a museum of religious art in Kaunas. From 1939 to 1944 he served as director of the Vilnius Art Museum. During this period his work was exhibited in a number of venues, including the International Exhibition of Decorative Arts in Paris, 1935; the International Press Exhibition at the Vatican, 1935; and the International Exhibition of Decorative Arts in Berlin, 1937, where he earned a medal for designing the Lithuanian Pavilion.

Anticipating the Soviet occupation of Lithuania at the end of World War II, in 1944 he emigrated first to West Germany and then to the United States, where he established a studio in Chicago. He designed and executed a number of stained glass works and mosaics, as well as acting as stage designer for the Lithuanian Opera Company of Chicago.

Valeska's work includes:

 Mosaics and stained glass at St. Philomena's Church in Chicago
 Stained glass windows at O'Hare Airport, Chicago
 Stained glass windows at Congregation Rodfei Zedek in Chicago
 Stained glass windows at the former Marshall Field's, Chicago
 Stained glass at Holy Cross Church, Dayton, Ohio
 Four oil paintings that depict scenes from Lithuanian and American history at Holy Cross Church in Chicago.
 Freestanding windows, part of an ongoing exhibition at the Smith Museum of Stained Glass, Navy Pier, Chicago
 Stained glass, pulpit, and paintings at St. Casimir Lithuanian Roman Catholic Church in Sioux City, Iowa.

After Lithuania regained its independence in 1990, he returned to the country of his birth, where he died at the age of 89 in 1994.

Sources
 "Valeška". Encyclopedia Lituanica VI: 44-45. (1970–1978). Ed. Simas Sužiedėlis. Boston, Massachusetts: Juozas Kapočius. LCCN 74-114275.

External links
 Works at Navy Pier, Chicago
 Works at Congregation Rodfei Zedek, Chicago
  Biography
 Stage Design
 Works by Valeska salvaged from St. Casimir Church, Sioux City, Iowa.
Adolfas Valeška: Artist and Art Conserver

1905 births
1994 deaths
People from Kybartai
People from Suwałki Governorate
Lithuanian stained glass artists and manufacturers
American people of Lithuanian descent
Lithuanian artists
Directors of museums in Lithuania